The New Party (NP) (Hakka: Sîn Tóng), formerly the Chinese New Party (CNP), is a Chinese nationalist political party in the Republic of China (Taiwan).

History 
The New Party was formed on 22 August 1993 out of a split from the then-ruling Kuomintang (KMT) by members of the New Kuomintang Alliance. Members of the Alliance had accused KMT Chairman Lee Teng-hui of autocratic tendencies and moving the party away from Chinese unification. Co-founders of the New Party included Chen Kuei-miao.  Originally, the party wanted to keep the name of the faction, but was prevented from doing so due to the similarity of names.  The name "New Party" was seemingly inspired by the contemporary electoral success of the Japan New Party ("Nihon Shintō"; see Politics of Japan).

At this time, the party favored direct presidential elections, the ideals of Sun Yat-sen, voluntary service instead of military service, and "equal protection of human rights." The party also called for direct flights between Taiwan and the mainland, speaking of a "Great Chinese Common Market."

In the mid-1990s, the New Party attracted support from the KMT old guard as well as young urban professionals.  The New Party was aided by former Finance Minister Wang Chien-shien and former Environmental Protection Administration Director Jaw Shaw-kong, who had charismatic and clean images.

In the 2000 presidential election, the party nominated writer and dissident Li Ao, who ran a spirited but token campaign.  In the election, most members of the party supported former provincial governor James Soong, who ran as an independent candidate after losing the KMT nomination and subsequently being expelled from the KMT, and in fact both Li Ao and the New Party leader Lee Ching-hua encouraged people to support him.  In the 2001 Legislative Yuan election, the party won a single seat, Wu Cherng-dean's, in Kinmen.

In the 2006 municipal elections, the New Party made significant gains, seating over a dozen members into public office.  The New Party also gained four seats in the Taipei Mayor's private offices.

Since the 2008 Legislative Yuan elections, the New Party has not won any seats, while the party supported most of the KMT candidates.

Election results

Presidential elections

Legislative elections

Local elections

National Assembly elections

Leaders
Convenors of the New Party National Committee
Jaw Shaw-kong (August 1993 – May 1994)
Yok Mu-ming (May 1994 – October 1994)
Wang Chien-shien (October 1994 – August 1995)
Chen Kuei-miao (August 1995 – August 1997)
Chou Yang-shan (August 1997 – August 1998)
Chen Kuei-miao (August 1998 – December 1998)
Feng Ting-kuo (acting; December 1998 – January 1999)
Lee Ching-hua (January 1999 – March 2000)
Hau Lung-pin (March 2000 – March 2001)
Hsieh Chi-ta (March 2001 – December 2001)
Levi Ying (acting; December 2001 – January 2002)
Yok Mu-ming (January 2002 – June 2003)
Chairmen of the New Party
Yok Mu-ming (June 2003 – 21 February 2021)
Wu Cherng-dean (since 21 February 2021)
 Vice chairmen of the New Party
Lee Sheng-feng (since 2016)

See also

History of the Republic of China
Politics of the Republic of China 
Elections in Taiwan
List of political parties in Taiwan
Administrative divisions of Taiwan
Political status of Taiwan

References

External links

 

 
Far-right politics in Taiwan
Social conservative parties
National conservative parties
Anti-Japanese sentiment in Taiwan